Frederick Cornwallis Conybeare,  (14 September 1856 – 9 January 1924) was a British orientalist, Fellow of University College, Oxford, and Professor of Theology at the University of Oxford.

Biography
Conybeare was born in Coulsdon, Surrey, the third son of a barrister, John Charles Conybeare, and grandson of the geologist William Daniel Conybeare.  He took an interest in the Order of Corporate Reunion, an Old Catholic organisation, becoming a Bishop in it in 1894. Also in the 1890s he wrote a book on the Dreyfus case, as a Dreyfusard, and translated the Testament of Solomon and other early Christian texts. As well, he did influential work on Barlaam and Josaphat. He was an authority on the Armenian Church.

From 1904 to 1915 he was a member of the Rationalist Press Association, founded in 1899.

One of his best-known works is Myth, Magic, and Morals from 1909, later reissued under the title The Origins of Christianity. This has been read both as strong criticism of the Jesus myth theory, making Conybeare a supporter of the historical Jesus; but also as an attack on aspects of orthodox Christianity itself. He returned later in 1914 to make a direct assault on leading proponents of the time of the Jesus-myth theory.

He died in 1924 aged 68 and is buried in Brompton Cemetery, London.

His wife Mary Emily was a translator of Wilhelm Scherer.

See also
Paulicianism
Apology of Aristides

Works

Books
 Outlines of a Philosophy of Religion by Hermann Lotze (1892) translator
 The Armenian Apology and Acts of Apollonius, and Other Monuments of Early Christianity (1896)
 The Demonology of the New Testament. I (1896)
 About the Contemplative Life; or the Fourth Book of the Treatise Concerning Virtues, by Philo Judaeus (1895) editor
 The Key of Truth, a Manual of the Paulician Church of Armenia (1898)
 The Story of Ahikar from the Syriac, Arabic, Armenian, Ethiopic, Greek and Slavonic Versions (1898) with J. Rendel Harris and Agnes Smith Lewis
 The Dreyfus Case (1899)
 Rituale Armenorum Being the Administration of the Sacraments & the Breviary Rites of the Armenian Church Together with the Greek Rites of Baptism & Epiphany edited from the oldest manuscripts (1905) with Arthur John Maclean
 Selections from the Septuagint According to the Text of Swete (1905) with St. George Stock, later as A Grammar of Septuagint Greek online
 The Armenian version of Revelation, Apocalypse of John the Divine (1907) editor
 Myth, Magic, and Morals: A Study of Christian Origins (1909)
 History of New Testament Criticism (1910)
 The Ring of Pope Xystus, Together with the Prologue of Rufinus (1910)
 The Life of Apollonius of Tyana: The Epistles of Apollonius and the Treatise of Eusebius. Philostratus (1912) translator, Loeb Classical Library, two volumes
 A Catalogue of the Armenian Manuscripts in the British Museum (1913)
 The Historical Christ; or, An investigation of the views of Mr. J. M. Robertson, Dr. A. Drews, and Prof. W. B. Smith (1914)
 Russian Dissenters (1921)
 The Armenian Church: Heritage and Identity. (St. Vartan Press: New York, 2001) edited by the Rev. Nerses Vrej Nersessian

Articles
"The Testament of Solomon" (translation), Jewish Quarterly Review (October 1898)
"The History of Christmas", The American Journal of Theology 3 (1899), 1–22
"Antiochus Strategos, The Capture of Jerusalem by the Persians in 614 AD " (translation), English Historical Review 25 (1910), 502–517
"The Philosophical Aspects of the Doctrine of Divine Incarnation" Jewish Quarterly Review (July 1895)
"The Demonology of the New Testament. I" Jewish Quarterly Review July 1896
"Christian Demonology. II" Jewish Quarterly Review October 1896
"Christian Demonology. III" Jewish Quarterly Review April 1897
 The Eusebian Form of the Text of Matthew 28:19 Zeitschrift für die neutestamentliche Wissenschaft (a journal) 2 (1901): 275–88
"The Survival of Animal Sacrifices inside the Christian Church" The American Journal of Theology January 1903
"The History of the Greek Church" The American Journal of Theology July 1903

References

External links

 
 
 

1856 births
1924 deaths
British orientalists
Critics of the Christ myth theory
British historians of religion
Fellows of University College, Oxford
Burials at Brompton Cemetery
19th-century British people
20th-century British people
Fellows of the British Academy
People from Coulsdon